is a Japanese model, actress and singer best known from her modeling work with CanCam magazine.

Personal life
On March 14, 2012, Yamada married Japanese actor Shun Oguri, and is a mother of four children, as of April 2020, according to reports made by an undisclosed acquaintance.

Discography

Studio albums

Singles

Filmography

Movies 
 Route 58 (2003) as Rin
 Kiseki wa Sora Kara Futte Kuru (2005) as Reiko Aoyama
 Akihabara@Deep (2006) as Akira
 Pulukogi (2007)
 Surf's Up (Japanese dub) (2007) as Lani Aliikai
 Kanna-san, Daiseiko Desu! (2008) as Kanna
 Shinjuku Swan (2015) as Ryoko
 Eating Women (2018)

Dramas 
 Kabachitare! (2001)
 Kindaichi Shounen no Jikenbo (2001)
 Kangei Danjiki Goikkou-sama (2001)
 Shiawase no Shippo (2002)
 Cosmetic (2003)
 Aisuru Tame ni Aisaretai Loved to Love (2003)
 Sore wa, Totsuzen, Arashi no youni... (2004)
 Orange Days (2004)
 Be-Bop High School (2004)
 Nihon no Kowai Yoru "Daiseikubi" (2004)
 X'mas Nante Daikirai (2004)
 Tales of Japan (2004)
 Be-Bop High School 2 (2005)
 Fukigen na Gene (2005)
 Yume de Aimashou (2005)
 Yonimo Kimyona Monogatari "Happunkan" (2005)
 Satomi Hakenden" (2006)
 Tsubasa no Oreta Tenshitachi "Actress" (2006)
 Zenibana (2006)
 Damens' Walker (2006)
 The Family (2007), Makiko Yasuda
 Zenibana 2 (2007)
 Nodame Cantabile in Europe (2008)
 Gokusen 3  (2008)
 Binbō Danshi (2008)
 Seigi no Mikata (2008)
 Akuma no Temari Uta (2009)
 Mei-chan no Shitsuji (2009)
 Gakeppuchi no Eri (2010)

Anime
 Paradise Kiss'' (2005) as Yukari Hayasaka

References

External links
 K Dash Group Profile
 
 Yu Yamada at JDorama

Living people
Japanese film actresses
Japanese television actresses
Japanese women pop singers
Japanese female models
Japanese television personalities
Musicians from Okinawa Prefecture
Pony Canyon artists
1984 births
21st-century Japanese actresses
21st-century Japanese women singers
21st-century Japanese singers